Shalva Toreli-Akhaltiskheli (died 1227) was a Georgian military commander and courtier, of the noble house of Toreli-Akhaltsikheli.

Shalva was one of the most notable military commanders during a series of expansionist wars waged by the Kingdom of Georgia under Queen Tamar (r. 1184–1213). He consecutively held top posts of mechurchletukhutsesi (Lord High Treasurer) and mandaturtukhutsesi (Lord High Mandator) at Tamar's court. Together with his brother Ivane, Shalva was in command of vanguard traditionally composed of the Meschian troops from south Georgia. In the battle of Shamkor against the Ildenizid atabeg of Azerbaijan in 1195, he captured a war banner sent by the Caliph to the Muslim army which was then donated to the revered icon of Our Lady of Khakhuli. In 1206/1207, Shalva, together with Sargis Tmogveli, took hold of the city of Kars from the Seljuqs and was appointed as the governor of the Kars county.

When the Khwarazmid shah Jalal ad-Din Mingburnu surged into the Caucasus in 1225, Shalva and his brother Ivane were again placed in charge of the vanguard of the Georgian army commanded by atabeg Ivane Mkhargrdzeli. There was some enmity between Ivane and the two Akhaltsikheli brothers. This was possibly the reason why Mkhargrdzeli did not allow his army to fight in the battle of Garni. The two brothers did battle and were routed. Shalva was wounded and captured and his brother Ivane was killed while retreating to the mountains. Having spent some time in honorary captivity, Shalva was put to death for not apostatizing to Islam at Jalal ad-Din's order. Subsequently, he was canonized by the Georgian Orthodox Church which commemorates him on June 17/June 30 (O.S.).

Shalva is traditionally believed to be praised in a patriotic Georgian folk ballad Shavlego, which was particularly popular during the national mobilization against the Soviet Union in the late 1980s.

References 

Military personnel from Georgia (country)
Saints of Georgia (country)
Nobility of Georgia (country)
1227 deaths
13th-century Christian saints
12th-century people from Georgia (country)
13th-century people from Georgia (country)
Year of birth unknown
People from Akhaltsikhe